Eero Haapalainen (Russian Эро Эрович Хаапалайнен, Ero Erovich Khaapalaynen; 27 October 1880 – 27 November 1937) was a Finnish politician, trade unionist and journalist, who was one of the most prominent figures of the Finnish socialist movement in the first two decades of the 1900s. In the 1918 Finnish Civil War he served as the commander-in-chief of the Red Guards. After the war, Haapalainen fled to Soviet Russia where he joined the exile Communist Party of Finland and the Communist Party of the Soviet Union. He was executed during the Great Purge in 1937.

Life

Early years 
Eero Haapalainen was born in the town of Kuopio in eastern Finland. His father Aaro was a carpenter and the mother, Wilhelmiina Kinnunen, a housewife who earned extra income as a seamstress for the shop of the author and social activist Minna Canth. Parents wanted him to become a priest, but after graduating from the Kuopio Lyceum, Haapalainen studied for two years in a business college and entered the Helsinki University Faculty of Law in 1901. In Helsinki, he was afflicted with the labor movement and joined the Sawmill Workers' Union and the Social Democratic Party of Finland. Due to lack of money, Haapalainen was not able to finish his studies and left the university in 1904. In 1903–1906, Haapalainen worked in the Social Democratic newspaper Työmies in Helsinki, and in 1907 he was the editor of Työ in Vyborg.

During the 1905 general strike, Haapalainen was one of the leading Red Guard organizers in Helsinki. A year later, he was the delegate of the Finnish Social Democratic Party at the 4th Congress of the Russian Social Democratic Labour Party in Stockholm. In the summer of 1906, Haapalainen represented Finnish Social Democrats in the underground Bolshevik committee planning the Sveaborg rebellion. In April 1907, Haapalainen was elected as the first chairman of the Finnish Trade Union Federation (SAJ) which was founded in the Tampere Workers' Hall. Haapalainen was expelled from the office in 1911 due to his drinking problem. Haapalainen now became a writer, he published and translated several books and articles focusing in trade unionism and cooperatives. Haapalainen also worked as an editor for the SAJ released monthly. In 1914, he served three months for political agitation.

In the 1918 Civil War 
After the 1917 February Revolution in Russia, the social situation in Finland became restless due to the food shortage and deep unemployment. Haapalainen was one of the most radical persons in the labour movement, he was openly speaking for armed revolution and organized Red Guards in southern Finland. In October, he became the commander of the Kymi Paper Mill Red Guard in Kuusankoski. A month later, Haapalainen was elected to the five-men committee which was in charge of all Finnish Red Guards. As the Civil War broke out in late January 1918, Haapalainen replaced Ali Aaltonen as the Red Guards commander-in-chief, even though he did not have any military training. He was also elected as the delegate for internal affairs (″internal minister″) of the Red governing body Finnish People's Delegation. As a Red Guard commander, he issued a manifesto proclaiming the Finnish Socialist Workers' Republic. In February, he guaranteed the safe removal for the composer Jean Sibelius from his home Ainola to the capital Helsinki.

After series of defeats, Haapalainen was replaced in 20 March by the troika Eino Rahja, Adolf Taimi and Evert Eloranta. He remained a member of the Red Government, but was dismissed in late April when the government had fled to Vyborg. Haapalainen was charged of drunkenness, inappropriate behavior and careless use of firearm. The Vyborg court martial ordered him to the front, but the decision was not implemented as the Red Government and most of the Red Guard staff fled to the Soviet Russia in 25 April. Haapalainen and Edvard Gylling were one of the few leading Reds who stayed in Vyborg. They organized the city's defense, but finally the Reds surrendered in 29 April. Haapalainen and Gylling avoided being caught. In May Haapalainen fled to Petrograd with a motor boat.

Life in the Soviet Union 
Haapalainen became a member of the Russian Communist Party, he was also one of the founders of the exile Communist Party of Finland in August 1918. Later in the fall of 1918, Haapalainen fought in the Russian Civil War in Perm in a unit organized by the Finnish worker Felix Ravelin. In the summer of 1919, Haapalainen was establishing a nursing home for disabled Finnish Red Guard veterans near Kiev, but the idea never realized. Haapalainen moved to Petrograd, where he worked as a lecturer in the Red Officer School and served as a political officer in the 6th Finnish Regiment of the Red Army. In March–April 1920, Haapalainen fought against the Finnish White Guards in the Estonian War of Independence.

In the summer of 1920, Haapalainen was moved to Petrozavodsk. He held several posts in the Karelian Workers' Commune but was dismissed in 1923 due to his drinking problem. Haapalainen was transferred to the town of Kalevala where he worked as an interpreter. In the beginning of 1925, Haapalainen was a member of the Finnish Komintern delegate in Germany. He started drinking again and was sent back home in March. As a result, Haapalainen was now expelled from the Communist Party. He moved back to Kalevala, where Haapalainen worked as a teacher and a newspaperman. His last assignment was the head of the revolution research department in the Karelian Research Institute in Petrozavodsk since May 1931. Haapalainen was expelled as a ″nationalist″ in October 1935. He lived as a pensioner and was arrested during the Great Purge in October 1937. In 20 November, Haapalainen was sentenced for 10 years, but he was eventually shot in Petrodzavodsk a week later. After Stalin's death, Haapalainen was rehabilitated in May 1957.

See also

 Kullervo Manner

References 

1880 births
1937 deaths
People from Kuopio
People from Kuopio Province (Grand Duchy of Finland)
Social Democratic Party of Finland politicians
Finnish trade union leaders
Finnish communists
People of the Finnish Civil War (Red side)
People of the Estonian War of Independence
People of the Russian Civil War
Finnish people executed by the Soviet Union
Great Purge victims from Finland
Finnish emigrants to the Soviet Union
Members of the Communist Party of the Soviet Union executed by the Soviet Union